Saana Valkama (born 27 June 1994) is a Finnish ice hockey player, currently playing in the Swedish Women's Hockey League (SDHL) with AIK Hockey Dam.

Valkama represented Finland at the IIHF Women's World Championship in 2012, 2016, and 2017, winning a bronze medal at the 2017 tournament. As a junior player with the Finnish national under-18 team, she participated in the IIHF Women's U18 World Championship tournaments in 2011 and 2012, winning a bronze medal at the 2011 tournament.

References

External links
 

1994 births
Living people
Finnish women's ice hockey forwards
People from Pirkkala
Finnish expatriate ice hockey players in Sweden
Finnish expatriate ice hockey players in the United States
AIK Hockey Dam players
Leksands IF Dam players
Linköping HC Dam players
Vermont Catamounts women's ice hockey players
Ilves Naiset players
Team Kuortane players
Sportspeople from Pirkanmaa